Alan George Schmelz (born November 12, 1943) is a former Major League Baseball pitcher who played for the New York Mets in 1967.

Early life
Prior to playing professionally, Schmelz attended Arizona State University.

Major league career
Schmelz made two appearances in the major leagues. His first came on September 7 when the then 23-year-old rookie pitched against the St. Louis Cardinals in relief of Jerry Hinsley. He threw two innings and allowed one run of three hits and a walk. He also struck out two batters, including future Hall of Famer Orlando Cepeda.

His next, and final, appearance came on September 24. He came into the game to relieve Don Cardwell and, despite giving up a hit, left the game without surrendering a run.

Overall, he went 0-0 with a 3.00 ERA in his two-game career. In three innings, he allowed four hits, a home run and a walk.

Minor league career
Schmelz pitched in the minor leagues from 1966 to 1969 in the Mets' (1966–1969), Oakland Athletics (1968) and Pittsburgh Pirates (1969) systems. Overall, he went 29-36 with a 3.13 ERA in 93 games (91 starts).

He showed flashes of excellence at times throughout his career. For example, in his first professional season, he went 15-5 with a 2.97 ERA for the Auburn Mets and Williamsport Mets. The following year, he posted a 2.60 ERA for Williamsport.

References

Living people
1943 births
Baseball players from California
New York Mets players
Arizona Instructional League Athletics players
Arizona State Sun Devils baseball players
Auburn Mets players
Alaska Goldpanners of Fairbanks players
Florida Instructional League Mets players
Jacksonville Suns players
Memphis Blues players
Pompano Beach Mets players
Vancouver Mounties players
Williamsport Mets players
York Pirates players